Harry J. Tutunjian was the Republican mayor of Troy, New York. He was elected in 2003 and re-elected in 2007. His term ended in 2012, when he could not seek reelection due to term limits. After being appointed for a position in the Rensselaer County Legislature, he lost an election for a full four-year term in 2012.

He holds a degree from Hudson Valley Community College.

Early political career 
Tutunjian was elected to represent Troy's 3rd city council district in 1999, winning by just 24 votes. In 2001, he ran at-large, and was elected with the most votes, making him council president.

References 

American people of Armenian descent
Living people
New York (state) Republicans
Mayors of places in New York (state)
Year of birth missing (living people)
Ethnic Armenian politicians